Hannah is a 2017 Italian drama film directed by Andrea Pallaoro. It was screened in the main competition section of the 74th Venice International Film Festival. At Venice, Charlotte Rampling won the Volpi Cup for Best Actress.

Cast
 Charlotte Rampling as Hannah
 André Wilms as Hannah's Husband
 Luca Avallone as Albert
 Jean-Michel Balthazar as Chris
 Fatou Traoré Theater Teacher
 Jessica Fanhan Subway Fighting Woman
 Ambra Mattioli Singer

Reception
On review aggregator website Rotten Tomatoes, the film holds an approval rating of 82% based on 38 reviews, and an average rating of 6.90/10.

References

External links
 

2017 films
2017 drama films
Italian drama films
2010s English-language films
Films directed by Andrea Pallaoro
2010s Italian films